Holy Sons is a one-man solo band built around American songwriter and drummer Emil Amos. Amos is notable for releasing "genre-bending" albums, according to LA Weekly music reviewer Chris Martins, and for being a prolific songwriter; one account in Spike Magazine suggests he has written over a thousand songs. Amos is also a multi-instrumentalist for groups such as Grails and Om and Lilacs & Champagne. Amos was born of the lo-fi home recording movement of the '80s and early '90s.

Amos described the mission of his music as "facing your personal reality". Amos said in an interview that, beginning at age 16, he used drugs every single day and did not let up for years. A music critic for The Guardian described him as a prolific songwriter and as having a "great voice". Reviewer Rob Cullivan of the Portland Tribune described Holy Sons' album Survivalist Tales to be an "ode to the dime novels in the early 1900s that peddled the stories of wilderness explorers," and described the music as "sonic wanderings" with "strange song structures". A review in the Portland Mercury described his music as "dark, languid psychedelia" and commented how Amos has "habitually been kept underground" with few live performances up until the last few years. His vocals have been compared to Neil Young but change personalities quite often. Willamette Week described the album Decline of the West as "a varied, meticulously constructed piece of avant-folk that stands alone by its own merits."

Discography

Albums

References

External links
 Holy Sons official website
 Holy Sons Bandcamp

Rock music groups from Oregon
American progressive rock groups
Musical groups from Portland, Oregon